Korban may refer to the following people
Given name
 Korban Blake, British multi-genre author.

Surname
 Gennady Korban (born 1949), Russian wrestler
 Hennadiy Korban (born 1970), Ukrainian businessman and art collector
 Kristina Korban, Ukrainian-American performer, model and movie producer
 Yelena Korban (born 1961), Soviet sprinter
 Korban (Tribes) An ancient tribes